A United Ireland is a hypothetical sovereign state comprising the island of Ireland, currently divided between the Republic of Ireland and Northern Ireland.

United Ireland or United Irelander  may also refer to
 United Ireland (newspaper) Irish nationalist newspaper (1881–1898) edited by William O'Brien
 United Ireland Party, another name for Fine Gael, an Irish political party founded in 1933. Initially used as its English-language title, it is now a rarely used subtitle.
 United Irish League, Irish nationalist party (1898–1920s) founded by William O'Brien
 United Irelander (blog), 2004–2009 blog about Irish politics

See also
 United Irishman (disambiguation)
 All-Ireland
 Partition of Ireland